The Latin American Spring was a series of anti-government protests and uprisings that spread across much of the Latin America between late 2010s and early 2020s. These series of protests are a response to opposing neoliberal economic policies and negligence in the Covid-19 pandemic.

Causes 

This chapter examines historic developments in Latin America (especially South America) over the past twenty five years that have been underreported in the United States but that have helped to transform the region and hemispheric relations. Beginning in 1998, voters in Latin America began to elect a series of leaders who ran on platforms explicitly opposing neoliberal economic policies. These left-wing governments (often referred to as a Pink tide) have pursued some policies that departed from those of the previous two to three decades. The rebound in economic growth, poverty reduction, and other changes in these countries, including Argentina, Bolivia, Brazil, Ecuador, and Venezuela, are examined in turn, as well as recent economic problems. These countries’ political choices have also led the region to become more independent of the United States than ever before, and the change in hemispheric relations is also examined.

References 

Latin American history
History of the Americas
History of South America
History of Central America
History of the Caribbean